Sir Eric William Riches,  (29 July 1897 – 8 November 1987) was a British surgeon, urologist, and decorated British Army officer. In 1955, he developed a new cystoscope, which was named after him as the Riches Cystoscope, in order to standardise the equipment and its attachments. He gave the Hunterian Oration at the Royal College of Surgeons in 1938 and 1942, and the Bradshaw Lecture in 1962.

Early life and education
Riches was born on 29 July 1897 in Alford, Lincolnshire, England.

Career

Military service
In 1915, having deferred his entry to university, Riches joined the British Army to fight in the First World War. On 4 January 1916, he was commissioned into the Lincolnshire Regiment as a temporary second lieutenant. He then served with the 10th Battalion, Lincolnshire Regiment.

Honours
In the 1958 Queen's Birthday Honours, he was appointed a Knight Bachelor in recognition of his service as "surgeon and urologist to Middlesex Hospital". On 15 July 1958, he was knighted by Prince Philip, Duke of Edinburgh during a ceremony at Buckingham Palace.

In 1964 he was awarded the BAUS's St Peter's Medal.

Selected works

References

1897 births
1987 deaths
British surgeons
British urologists
British Army personnel of World War I
Knights Bachelor
Recipients of the Military Cross
Fellows of the Royal College of Surgeons
People from Alford, Lincolnshire
Royal Lincolnshire Regiment officers
20th-century surgeons
Recipients of the St Peter's Medal
Military personnel from Lincolnshire